CONtv is an OTT streaming service launched in March 2015 as a joint venture between Cinedigm and Wizard World.

The service is catered towards fans of geek and nerd culture, featuring cult classic films and television series, digital comics, and behind-the-scenes content from Wizard World's Comic Cons.

History
In November 2017, Cinedigm had announced the launch of a 24/7 "Always On" channel on Amazon-owned streaming platform Twitch. The linear service showcases acquired and original programming from CONtv's library.

On February 5, 2019, Viewster was acquired by Cinedigm and, on June 13, 2020, would merge with CONtv and rebranded as CONtv Anime.

Programming

Original Programming
Fight of the Living Dead - Following digital celebrities as they fight to survive a “real-world” Zombie Apocalypse.
Last Fan Standing, a game show hosted by Bruce Campbell.
My Morphing Life - a reality series following Jason David Frank through his many convention experiences.
Mythica: A Quest for Heroes - And original feature starring Kevin Sorbo of Hercules: The Legendary Journeys fame.

Availability
CONtv is available across several devices, including Roku, Apple iOS, Android, Xbox, and smart TVs.

References

External links 

 

Internet television channels
Video hosting
Video on demand services
Cinedigm